Joseph "Joe" Yearby is an American football running back who is a free agent. He played college football at the University of Miami. He was a backup to running back Duke Johnson as a freshman, but started in his sophomore year. In his sophomore year, he became just the ninth player from the University of Miami to surpass 1,000 yards in a season.

College career
Yearby was a 4-Star recruit coming out of Miami Central High School. He committed to Miami on February 26, 2013.

College statistics

Yearby played in 12 games in his Freshman year, rushed for 509 yards in 86 carries for 1 touchdown and also caught 8 passes for 119 yards and a touchdown. In his sophomore year he played in 13 games rushing for 1,002 yards and 6 touchdowns also added 23 receptions for 273 yards and 3 touchdowns. He was named to the third-team All-ACC after his 2015 campaign.

Following the completion of his junior season, on January 3, 2017, the University of Miami announced that Yearby would forego his Senior season to enter the 2017 NFL Draft.

Professional career 
On August 1, 2018, Yearby was signed by the Orlando Apollos of the Alliance of American Football.

References
3. ^ "Miami Hurricanes Football 2016 Player Profile: Joseph Yearby".

External links
Miami Hurricanes bio

Living people
American football running backs
Miami Hurricanes football players
Miami Central Senior High School alumni
Players of American football from Miami
Orlando Apollos players
Year of birth missing (living people)